Emery Farm is a continually owned family farm in the United States founded in 1655 and located in Durham, New Hampshire. During its history, the farm was used mainly for timber harvesting and for growing hay and grain that was sold locally for animal feed.

See also 
List of oldest companies

References

External links 

Homepage

Farms in New Hampshire
Companies established in the 17th century
17th-century establishments in New Hampshire